Admiral Sir William Wynter (c. 1521 – 20 February 1589) was an admiral and principal officer of the Council of the Marine under Queen Elizabeth I of England and served the crown during the Anglo-Spanish War (1585–1604).

Personal
Wynter was born at Brecknock, the son of John Wynter (died 1546 - a merchant and sea captain of Bristol and treasurer of the navy, who was friendly with Sir Thomas Cromwell) and Alice, daughter of William Tirrey of Cork.

Naval career 

William was schooled in the navy. He took part in the 260 ship expedition of 1544, which burned Leith and Edinburgh, and held the office of Keeper of the King's Storehouse at Deptford Strand. In 1545 he served in Lord Lisle's channel fleet; two years later he took part in Protector Somerset's expedition to Scotland and victory at Pinkie, and, in 1549, an expedition to Guernsey and Jersey. 

In that year (1549), he was appointed Surveyor of the Navy, and in December as captain of the Mynion he captured the prize of a French ship, the Mary of Fécamp, laden with sugar. A reward of £100 was to be shared out among the crew of 300. In 1550, he superintended the removal of the ships from Portsmouth to Gillingham in the Thames Estuary, Edward VI owed him £471 for a voyage to Ireland in 1552, and, in 1553, he went on a voyage to the Levant.
In 1554, Wynter spent several months in the Tower of London under suspicion of involvement in Thomas Wyatt's rebellion against Mary I of England, until he was pardoned in November.

In 1557, Wynter was appointed Master of Navy Ordnance, which post he held along with the Surveyorship for the rest of his life. He was present at the burning of Conquet in 1558. On 22 May 1558, Wynter brought ships from Dunkirk to Dover which were sailing on to Portsmouth. He was sent with a fleet to Scotland in January 1560 during the crisis of the Scottish Reformation commanding the Irish Squadron.

Mission to Scotland

Wynter commanded a fleet to guard against French landings in Scotland in 1559, while diplomatic efforts were made to negotiate sending an English army to aid the Scottish Protestants. After briefing at Gillingham, Wynter left Queenborough in the Lyon on 27 December, and sailed from the Lowestoft sea-road on 14 January with 12 men-of-war followed by two supply ships, the Bull and the Saker. After the fleet was dispersed by a storm off Flamborough Head on 16 January, the damaged Swallow, Falcon, and Jerfalcon were left at Tynemouth, and the rest of the fleet passed Bamborough Castle to Berwick upon Tweed, where 600 hand gunners were embarked. 

The Duke of Norfolk, commander in the North, gave Wynter orders to hinder any French landings in the Firth of Forth, but to avoid battle, pretending he came up-river by chance without any official commission. At Coldingham bay, Wynter paused to send a copy of his log, which survives, to London. He was observed by Lord John Stewart, Commendator of Coldingham, a half-brother of Mary, Queen of Scots.

Eight ships including the Antelope and Lyon carried on into the Firth of Forth towards the fortress Island of Inchkeith on 21 January 1560. Wynter's blockade was immediately effective in preventing communication by sea from Edinburgh to the French garrison at Dunbar Castle. Although he could not do as much as he wished because his small landing boats were lost in the storm, he captured two French ships loaded with armaments. At first the French had thought that Wynter's fleet were French ships bringing more troops, and their response was to send these boats loaded with munition for Henri Cleutin who was advancing on St Andrews. Instead, Cleutin was forced to race back to Stirling overland, and William Kirkcaldy of Grange delayed him by cutting the bridge over the Devon at Tullibody.

On 24 January 1560, Wynter allowed the Scottish Snawdoun Herald John Patterson with the trumpet messenger James Drummond aboard the Lyon, who demanded to know his business in Scottish waters. As instructed, Wynter told Snawdoun he had been bound for Berwick, and came into the Forth expecting "friendly entertainment" as the nations were at peace. As the French forts had fired on him, and he had heard of the political situation in Scotland, he had taken it upon himself to aid the Lords of the Congregation against the "wicked practices of the French," and so Elizabeth I of England knew nothing of it. Patterson and Drummond visited the English fleet four times.

Wynter's actions and speech to the herald were reported to the Privy Council of England. To maintain the pretence he was instructed not to bring any ships he captured to England, but berth them in the friendly harbours of Dundee and St Andrews which were in Protestant hands. As late as 16 February 1560, Norfolk sent the Chester Herald, William Flower, to Mary of Guise who declared the English fleet had arrived in the Firth by accident. She claimed that the Lords of the Congregation had revealed advance knowledge of Wynter's mission and were in communication with him. Flower replied that he had no knowledge of ships or letters. While this ineffectual diplomacy continued, the Lords of the Congregation concluded the Treaty of Berwick with Norfolk, which set conditions for English intervention. Some of the sons of the leading Protestants were given up as hostages to guarantee the treaty, and these boys were delivered to Wynter.

Wynter continued to harass shipping and then supported the English army brought in by the Treaty of Berwick to the Siege of Leith. He burnt seven ships under d'Elbouf; not only that, all supplies were cut off from France. He kept up a naval bombardment of the town. On Saturday, 7 May 1560, Wynter waited for a signal to sail up the Water of Leith and land 500 men on the quayside called the Shore, but the signal never came as the English assault on the walls had failed. 

The siege was ended by the negotiation of the Treaty of Edinburgh of 1560 which was the effective conclusion to the 'Auld Alliance'. Lord Burghley reported to the Privy Council that all spoke well of Wynter's conduct and he "was to be cherished." In July, Wynter discussed his fleet's return to Gillingham for re-fitting in dry-dock, but "the most expert officers of the Admiralty" sent the fleet to active service at Portsmouth, on their way escorting the ships evacuating the French army from Scotland to Calais.

In 1561, he purchased Lydney Manor in Gloucestershire as his residence. In that year, he helped save the Palace of the Bishop of London from fire by advising the Mayor of London, William Harpur to demolish the roof of the adjacent north aisle of St Paul's Cathedral when the church caught fire after being struck by lightning on 4 June 1561. 

In 1563, he served in the fleet off Havre. In 1570, he was sent by Elizabeth I to escort Anne of Austria on her sea journey from the Netherlands to mary Philip II of Spain.

Operations off Ireland
In 1571, during the first of the Desmond Rebellions one of Wynter's ships was seized at Kinsale by James Fitzmaurice Fitzgerald, the Irish rebel. On 12 August 1573, Wynter was knighted, but, in 1577, he was passed over for the post of treasurer of the navy in place of Sir John Hawkins, a promotion that would have doubled his income. Nevertheless, Sir William Wynter and his brother, George, both received a handsome return on their investment in Sir Francis Drake's 1577 Voyage. 

In 1579, he commanded the squadron off Smerwick in Ireland, cutting off the sea-routes and seizing the ships of the papal invasion force, which was landed by Fitzmaurice in the company of Nicholas Sanders launching the Second Desmond Rebellion; during this campaign he assisted in the siege of Carrigafoyle Castle.

Spanish Armada 

In 1588, the year of the Spanish Armada, Wynter joined the main fleet of Lord Howard off Calais and proposed the fire-ship plan to drive the Spaniards from their anchorage; he took a celebrated part in the battle off Gravelines on 29 July, which was the only time in his career when he had hard fighting. During the engagement, he received a severe blow on the hip when a demi-cannon toppled over. It is said that he was the only one to have understood the completeness of the navy's defence, assessing from his experience at Leith that the enemy army's transport would require 300 ships, while Howard and Drake thought that the invasion of England might still take place despite the naval repulse delivered to the armada.

Vice-Admiral of England Sir William Wynter was granted the manor of Lydney in recognition of his services against the Spanish Armada. His portrait was included in the Armada Tapestries. 

Having been created admiral, Wynter supported charges of dishonesty against the treasurer of the navy, Hawkins, and wrote critically of him to Sir William Cecil, Lord Burghley.

Offices held
 Served on expeditions against Scotland (1544, 1547)
 Channel Fleet (1545)
 Keeper of the Deptford Storehouse (1546)
 Surveyor and Rigger of the Navy (8 July 1549 to 11 July 1589)
 Master of Naval Ordnance (1557-1589)
 Admiral in all seagoing expeditions (1557-88)
 JP, Gloucestershire (from c. 1564)
 Commissioner of Sewers, Kent, Surrey, and Sussex (1564)
 Mission to the Prince of Orange (1576)
 Steward and Receiver, Duchy of Lancaster lands in Gloucestershire and Herefordshire (from 1580)

Legacy 
Wynter married Mary Langton (died 4 November 1573, Seething Lane, London, daughter of Thomas and Mary Langton) and had issue:
 Edward
 William
 Nicholas (died fighting Spaniards)
 James (died young)
 Mary
 Elizabeth 
 Eleanor
 Jane
 Sarah
His grandson was John Winter who was an active royalist during the English Civil War.

Wynter died on 20 February 1589 aged 68. A Latin eulogy by William Patten was published in that year.

References 
Richard Bagwell, Ireland under the Tudors 3 vols. (London, 1885–1890).

Notes

1520s births
1589 deaths
Year of birth uncertain
People from Brecknockshire
English admirals
16th-century Royal Navy personnel
People of Elizabethan Ireland
16th-century Welsh military personnel
Scottish Reformation
16th century in Scotland
English MPs 1559
English MPs 1563–1567
English MPs 1572–1583

English MPs 1586–1587
People of the Second Desmond Rebellion
16th-century Welsh politicians
William
Knights Bachelor
English knights